Thomas Payne was an American baseball left fielder in the Negro leagues. He played with Homestead Grays and Baltimore Black Sox in 1933.

References

External links
 and Seamheads

Baltimore Black Sox players
Homestead Grays players
Year of birth unknown
Year of death unknown
Baseball outfielders